A coating is a covering that is applied to the surface of an object, usually referred to as the substrate. The purpose of applying the coating may be decorative, functional, or both. Coatings may be applied as liquids, gases or solids e.g. Powder coatings.  

Paints and lacquers are coatings that mostly have dual uses of protecting the substrate and being decorative, although some artists paints are only for decoration, and the paint on large industrial pipes is for preventing corrosion and identification e.g. blue for process water, red for fire-fighting control etc. Functional coatings may be applied to change the surface properties of the substrate, such as adhesion, wettability, corrosion resistance, or wear resistance. In other cases, e.g. semiconductor device fabrication (where the substrate is a wafer), the coating adds a completely new property, such as a magnetic response or electrical conductivity, and forms an essential part of the finished product.

A major consideration for most coating processes is that the coating is to be applied at a controlled thickness, and a number of different processes are in use to achieve this control, ranging from a simple brush for painting a wall, to some very expensive machinery applying coatings in the electronics industry. A further consideration for 'non-all-over' coatings is that control is needed as to where the coating is to be applied. A number of these non-all-over coating processes are printing processes. Many industrial coating processes involve the application of a thin film of functional material to a substrate, such as paper, fabric, film, foil, or sheet stock. If the substrate starts and ends the process wound up in a roll, the process may be termed "roll-to-roll" or "web-based" coating. A roll of substrate, when wound through the coating machine, is typically called a web.

Applications 
Coating applications are diverse and serve many purposes, . Coatings can be both decorative and have other functions.  A pipe carrying water for a fire suppression system can be coated with a red (for identification) anticorrosion paint. Most coatings to some extent protect the substrate, such as maintenance coatings for metals and concrete. A decorative  coating can offer a particular reflective property such as high gloss, satin or flat/matt appearance.

A major coating application is to protect metal from corrosion. This use includes preserving machinery, equipment and structures. Most automobiles are made of metal. The body and  underbody are typically coated. Anticorrosion coatings may use graphene in combination with water-based epoxies.

Coatings are used to seal the surface of concrete, such as seamless polymer/resin flooring, bund wall/containment lining, waterproofing and damp proofing concrete walls and bridge decks.

Roof coatings are designed primarily for waterproofing and sun reflection to reduce heating. They tend to be elastomeric to allow for movement of the roof without cracking the coating membrane.

The coating, sealing and waterproofing of wood has been going on since biblical times, with God commanding Noah to build an ark and then coat it. Wood was and is a key material of construction since ancient times so its preservation by coating has received much attention. Efforts to improve the performance of wood coatings continues.

Coatings are used to alter tribological properties and wear characteristics. Other functions of coatings include:
 Anti-fouling coatings
 Anti-Friction, Wear and Scuffing Resistance Coatings for Rolling-element bearings
 Anti-microbial coatings. 
 Anti-reflective coatings for example on spectacles.
 Coatings that alter or have magnetic, electrical or electronic properties.
 Flame retardant coatings. Flame-retardant materials and coatings are being developed that are phosphorus and bio-based. These include coatings with intumescent functionality.
 Non-stick PTFE coated cooking pots/pans.
 Optical coatings are available that alter optical properties of a material or object.
 UV coatings

Analysis and characterization

Numerous destructive and non-destructive evaluation (NDE) methods exist for characterizing coatings. The most common destructive method is microscopy of a mounted cross-section of the coating and its substrate. The most common non-destructive techniques include ultrasonic thickness measurement, X-ray fluorescence (XRF), X-Ray diffraction (XRD) and micro hardness indentation. X-ray photoelectron spectroscopy (XPS) is also a classical characterization method to investigate the chemical composition of the nanometer thick surface layer of a material. Scanning electron microscopy coupled with energy dispersive X-ray spectrometry (SEM-EDX, or SEM-EDS) allows to visualize the surface texture and to probe its elementary chemical composition. Other characterization methods include transmission electron microscopy (TEM), atomic force microscopy (AFM), scanning tunneling microscope (STM), and Rutherford backscattering spectrometry (RBS). Various methods of Chromatography are also used, as well as thermogravimetric analysis.

Formulation
The formulation of a coating depends primarily on the function required of the coating and also on aesthetics required such as color and gloss. The four primary ingredients are the resin (or binder), solvent which maybe water (or solventless), pigment(s) and additives. Research is ongoing to remove heavy metals from coating formulations completely.

Processes
Coating processes may be classified as follows:

Vapor deposition

Chemical vapor deposition 

 Metalorganic vapour phase epitaxy
 Electrostatic spray assisted vapour deposition (ESAVD)
 Sherardizing
 Some forms of Epitaxy
 Molecular beam epitaxy

Physical vapor deposition 

 Cathodic arc deposition
 Electron beam physical vapor deposition (EBPVD)
 Ion plating
 Ion beam assisted deposition (IBAD)
 Magnetron sputtering
 Pulsed laser deposition
 Sputter deposition
 Vacuum deposition
 Vacuum evaporation, evaporation (deposition)
 Pulsed electron deposition (PED)

Chemical and electrochemical techniques
 Conversion coating
 Autophoretic, the registered trade name of a proprietary series of autodepositing coatings specifically for ferrous metal substrates
 Anodising
 Chromate conversion coating
 Plasma electrolytic oxidation
 Phosphate (coating)
 Ion beam mixing
 Pickled and oiled, a type of plate steel coating
 Plating
 Electroless plating
 Electroplating

Spraying
 Spray painting
 High velocity oxygen fuel (HVOF)
 Plasma spraying
 Thermal spraying
 Kinetic metallization (KM)
 Plasma transferred wire arc thermal spraying
 The common forms of Powder coating

Roll-to-roll coating processes
Common roll-to-roll coating processes include:
 Air knife coating
 Anilox coater
 Flexo coater
 Gap Coating
 Knife-over-roll coating
 Gravure coating
 Hot melt coating- when the necessary coating viscosity is achieved by temperature rather than solution of the polymers etc.  This method commonly implies slot-die coating above room temperature, but it also is possible to have hot-melt roller coating; hot-melt metering-rod coating, etc.
 Immersion dip coating
 Kiss coating
 Metering rod (Meyer bar) coating
 Roller coating
 Forward roller coating
 Reverse roll coating
 Silk Screen coater
 Rotary screen
Slot Die coating - Slot die coating was originally developed in the 1950s. Slot die coating has a low operational cost and is easily scaled processing technique for depositing thin and uniform films rapidly, while minimizing material waste. Slot die coating technology is used to deposit a variety of liquid chemistries onto substrates of various materials such as glass, metal, and polymers by precisely metering the process fluid and dispensing it at a controlled rate while the coating die is precisely moved relative to the substrate. The complex inner geometry of conventional slot dies require machining or can be accomplished with 3-D printing.
Extrusion coating - generally high pressure, often high temperature, and with the web travelling much faster than the speed of the extruded polymer
Curtain coating- low viscosity, with the slot vertically above the web and a gap between slotdie and web.
 Slide coating- bead coating with an angled slide between the slotdie and the bead. Commonly used for multilayer coating in the photographic industry.
 Slot die bead coating- typically with the web backed by a roller and a very small gap between slotdie and web.
 Tensioned-web slotdie coating- with no backing for the web.
 Inkjet printing
 Lithography
 Flexography

Physical 
 Langmuir-Blodgett
 Spin coating
 Dip coating

See also

 Adhesion Tester
 Deposition
 Electrostatic coating
 Film Coating drugs
 Formulations
 Langmuir-Blodgett film
 Nanoparticle deposition
 Optically active additive, for inspection purposes after a coating operation
 Paint
 Paper coating
 Plastic film
 Polymer science
 Printed electronics
 Seal (mechanical)
 Thermal barrier coating
 Thermal cleaning
 Thin-film deposition
 Thermosetting polymer
 Vitreous enamel

References

Further reading
 
 
 Titanium and titanium alloys, edited by C. Leyens and M. Peters, Wiley-VCH, table 6.2: overview of several coating systems and fabriction processes for titanium alloys and titanium aluminides (amended)
 Coating Materials for Electronic Applications: Polymers, Processes, Reliability, Testing by James J. Licari; William Andrew Publishing, Elsevier, 
 High-Performance Organic Coatings, ed. AS Khanna, Elsevier BV, 2015, 

 
Corrosion
Materials science
Printing